Lej Nair may refer to:

Lej Nair (Bernina), a lake in the Grisons, Switzerland - 
Lej Nair (Silvaplana), a lake in the Grisons, Switzerland -

See also

Lai Nair, Tarasp
Lai Neir (Alp Flix), Sur
Black Lake (disambiguation)